Gergely Sandor Kiss (born November 6, 1983 in Orosháza) is an amateur Hungarian freestyle wrestler, who competed in the men's heavyweight category. Kiss represented Hungary at the 2008 Summer Olympics in Beijing, where he competed for the 96 kg class in men's freestyle wrestling. Kiss reached only into the second preliminary match, where he lost to Uzbekistan's Kurban Kurbanov, with a technical score of 5–9 and a classification score of 1–3.

References

External links
FILA Profile
NBC 2008 Olympics profile

Hungarian male sport wrestlers
1983 births
Living people
Olympic wrestlers of Hungary
Wrestlers at the 2008 Summer Olympics
People from Orosháza
Sportspeople from Békés County